SS John Hay was a Liberty ship built in the United States during World War II. She was named after John Hay, private secretary and assistant to Abraham Lincoln, the 12th United States Assistant Secretary of State, United States Ambassador to the United Kingdom, and United States Secretary of State under Presidents William McKinley and Theodore Roosevelt.

Construction
John Hay was laid down on 5 January 1943, under a Maritime Commission (MARCOM) contract, MC hull 1525, by J.A. Jones Construction, Panama City, Florida; she was sponsored by Mrs. L.R. Sanford, wife MARCOM regional director ship construction Gulf-Coast, and launched on 31 May 1943.

History
She was allocated to A.H. Bull & Co., Inc., on 30 June 1943. On 12 February 1946, she was laid up in the National Defense Reserve Fleet, in the Suisun Bay Group. On 16 May 1955, she was withdrawn from the fleet to be loaded with grain under the "Grain Program 1955", she transferred, loaded with grain, to the National Defense Reserve Fleet, in Olympia, Washington, on 29 June 1955. She was withdrawn from the fleet on 23 June 1957, to have the grain unloaded, she returned empty on 28 June 1957. On 15 December 1960, she was sold for $54,031.33 to Commercial Metals Co., for scrapping. She was removed from the fleet on 11 January 1960.

References

Bibliography

 
 
 
 

 

Liberty ships
Ships built in Panama City, Florida
1943 ships
Suisun Bay Reserve Fleet
Olympia Reserve Fleet
Olympia Reserve Fleet Grain Program